The King Mosque ( or Xhamia e Hynqarit), also known as the Sultan's Mosque or Sultan Bayezid Mosque, is a mosque and a Cultural Monument in Berat City, Berat County, Albania.

The mosque was built in the 15th century by the Ottoman sultan Bayezid II for the local Albanian population. The King mosque became a Cultural Monument in 1948.

References

15th-century mosques
Cultural Monuments of Albania
Mosques in Berat
Ottoman architecture in Albania